Mate Lacić (born 12 October 1980 in Split) is a Croatian retired footballer (defender) who last played for Polish club Cracovia.

Club career
Lacić signed a two-year contract with German side 1860 München in summer 2000.

After retiring as a player, he worked as a scout for Polish side Legia Warsaw.

Honours
Polish Cup:
2007

References

External links
 

1980 births
Living people
Footballers from Split, Croatia
Association football defenders
Croatian footballers
RNK Split players
TSV 1860 Munich II players
HNK Rijeka players
NK Široki Brijeg players
HŠK Posušje players
Maccabi Netanya F.C. players
Dyskobolia Grodzisk Wielkopolski players
Zagłębie Lubin players
GKS Bełchatów players
MKS Cracovia (football) players
Croatian Football League players
Premier League of Bosnia and Herzegovina players
Israeli Premier League players
Ekstraklasa players
Croatian expatriate footballers
Expatriate footballers in Germany
Croatian expatriate sportspeople in Germany
Expatriate footballers in Bosnia and Herzegovina
Croatian expatriate sportspeople in Bosnia and Herzegovina
Expatriate footballers in Israel
Croatian expatriate sportspeople in Israel
Expatriate footballers in Poland
Croatian expatriate sportspeople in Poland